Pomalidomide (INN; marketed as Pomalyst in the US and Imnovid in the European Union and Russia) is a derivative of thalidomide marketed by Celgene.  It is anti-angiogenic and also acts as an immunomodulator.

Pomalidomide was approved in February 2013, by the US Food and Drug Administration (FDA) as a treatment for relapsed and refractory multiple myeloma. It has been approved for use in people who have received at least two prior therapies including lenalidomide and bortezomib and have demonstrated disease progression on or within 60 days of completion of the last therapy.  It received a similar approval from the European Commission in August 2013.

Origin and development
The parent compound of pomalidomide, thalidomide, was originally discovered to inhibit angiogenesis in 1994. Based upon this discovery, thalidomide was taken into clinical trials for cancer, leading to its ultimate FDA approval for multiple myeloma. Structure-activity studies revealed that amino substituted thalidomide had improved antitumor activity, which was due to its ability to directly inhibit both the tumor cell and vascular compartments of myeloma cancers.  This dual activity of pomalidomide makes it more efficacious than thalidomide in vitro and in vivo.

Mechanism of action
Pomalidomide directly inhibits angiogenesis and myeloma cell growth.  This dual effect is central to its activity in myeloma, rather than other pathways such as TNF alpha inhibition, since potent TNF inhibitors including rolipram and pentoxifylline do not inhibit myeloma cell growth or angiogenesis. Upregulation of interferon gamma, IL-2 and IL-10 as well as downregulation of IL-6 have been reported for pomalidomide. These changes may contribute to pomalidomide's anti-angiogenic and anti-myeloma activities.

Pregnancy and sexual contact warnings
Because pomalidomide can cause harm to unborn babies when administered during pregnancy, women taking pomalidomide must not become pregnant.

To avoid embryo-fetal exposure, a "Risk Evaluation and Mitigation Strategy" (REMS) program was developed to ensure pregnancy prevention or distribution of the drug to those who are or might become pregnant. Women must produce two negative pregnancy tests and use contraception methods before beginning pomalidomide. Women must commit either to abstain continuously from heterosexual sexual intercourse or to use two methods of reliable birth control, beginning four weeks prior to initiating treatment with pomalidomide, during therapy, during dose interruptions and continuing for four weeks following discontinuation of pomalidomide therapy.

Pomalidomide is present in the semen of people receiving the drug. Therefore, males must always use a latex or synthetic condom during any sexual contact with females of reproductive potential while taking pomalidomide and for up to 28 days after discontinuing pomalidomide, even if they have undergone a successful vasectomy. Males taking pomalidomide must not donate sperm.

Clinical trials
Phase I trial results showed tolerable side effects.

Phase II clinical trials for multiple myeloma and myelofibrosis reported 'promising results'.

Phase III results showed significant extension of progression-free survival, and overall survival (median 11.9 months vs. 7.8 months; p = 0.0002) in patients taking pomalidomide and dexamethasone vs. dexamethasone alone.

See also 
 Lenalidomide, another thalidomide analog
 Development of analogs of thalidomide

References

External links 
 

Aromatic amines
Bristol Myers Squibb
Drugs with unknown mechanisms of action
Glutarimides
Immunosuppressants
Orphan drugs
Phthalimides